This is a list of Railway lines in Pakistan. The lines and the stations are owned and operated by Pakistan Railways. Rail lines in Pakistan are divided into main lines and branch lines.

Main lines

Branch lines
 Hyderabad–Badin Branch Line
 Hyderabad–Khokhrapar Branch Line
 Bahawalnagar–Fort Abbas Branch Line
 Samasata–Amruka Branch Line
 Sher Shah–Kot Addu Branch Line
 Lodhran–Khanewal Chord Line
 Lodhran–Raiwind Branch Line
 Khanewal–Wazirabad Branch Line
 Shorkot–Sheikhupura Branch Line
 Shorkot–Lalamusa Branch Line
 Jand–Kohat Branch Line
 Bannu–Tank Branch Line
 Daud Khel–Lakki Marwat Branch Line
 Malakwal–Khushab Branch Line
 Sangla Hill–Kundian Branch Line
 Lahore–Wagah Branch Line
 Shahdara Bagh–Sangla Hill Branch Line
 Shahdara Bagh–Chak Amru Branch Line
 Wazirabad–Narowal Branch Line
 Golra Sharif–Kohat Branch Line
 Jaranwala-Lyallpur Branch Line

Proposed lines
 Karachi–Gwadar Railway Line  (Makran Coastal Railway)
 Mandra–Bhaun Railway
 Gwadar–Mastung Branch Line
 Jacobabad–Gwadar Branch Line
 Basima–Jacobabad Branch Line
 Zhob Valley Railway
 Islamabad–Muzaffarabad Branch Line
 Mazar-i-Sharif-Kabul-Peshawar railway line
 Khunjerab Railway (China–Pakistan railway)

Tourist and heritage railways
Changa Manga Forestry Railway
Dandot Light Railway
Kandahar State Railway
Khewra Salt Mines Railway
Khyber Pass Railway
Larkana–Jacobabad Light Railway
Mardan–Charsadda Branch Line
Mirpur Khas–Nawabshah Railway
Nowshera–Dargai Branch Line

Proposed Standard Gauge Line to Iran 

Pakistan Railways is working on plans to construct a 635km standard-gauge line from Quetta to Taftan on the Pakistan-Iranian border.

The proposed railway would support the transport of high-value goods to Europe and Central Asia. Trains on the Islamabad – Tehran – Istanbul route currently take around five days to complete the journey, possibly due to poor or compromised condition of the track. It is claimed that a standard-gauge line would reduce journey times to 20 hours.

See also
 Abandoned and dismantled railway lines in Pakistan
 List of railway stations in Pakistan

References

External links

 Planned railway lines in Pakistan

 
Pakistan